The World Ranking Masters was ten-pin bowling's international ranking system, as with professional tennis. It was governed by the World Tenpin Bowling Association (WTBA). The rankings were formulated at the end of the three international tours, the European, Americas (not "American", although it does cover the US) and Asian tours.

The last World Ranking Masters was conducted by WTBA in 2009.

Organisation

It was divided into the following geographical Zones/Tours:

American Bowling Federation   which consists of North and South America and has the Americas Bowling Tour.
Asian Bowling Federation   which consists of Asia, Australia, Western Pacific and has the Asian Bowling Tour.
European Tenpin Bowling Federation (ETBF)  which consists of Europe and South Africa and is host to the European Bowling Tour (EBT) (similar to that of the PBA's Tour)

When all three vast tours were complete, the top 8 bowlers over the three tours were invited each year to the World Ranking Masters.

For example, with the EBT, the list can be found on the official ETBF website . It is also reported on in the leading Tenpin news site .

The World Ranking Masters is played on the "Dual Condition" format.  Over the years the format has changed.  The current qualifying format takes place over 3 days, with 8 games being played each day.  The first day is played on a "long" lane pattern (oiled to around 44 ft), the second on a "short" pattern (oiled to around 35 ft).  The final day is played on a "mixed" pattern (each lane is dressed alternately with the long and short patterns).

The top 8 men and top 8 women over the 24 games qualify for the single-elimination matchplay finals. The finalists are seeded according to their final position in qualifying. The finals are played using "best of 3" matchplay style on alternating lane patterns. The higher seeded player has the choice of which pattern to start on.

These patterns force the players to attack the 2 different lane conditions using different angles/equipment/hand positions and is the best way to determine the player with the most skills, versatility and knowledge.

2007 - Lake Wales, Florida
The 2007 World Ranking Masters event will be held in the Kegel Training centre, Lake Wales, Florida after the original Hosts, Qatar withdrew from hosting the event in February 2007.

The five-day competition will start May 3 and will conclude with the TV finals on May 7.

"We have TV again. It will be a 90-minute show this time, maybe even two hours", Kegel founder John Davis proudly stated. "The county made the decision to back the show. It seems they were very happy with our performance and ratings last time."

It marks the third time after 2003 and 2005 that the prestigious event will come to the Kegel headquarters.

"This will be the 7th edition of this tournament and we are proud to be able to have the tournament at our Kegel Training and Tournament centre here in Lake Wales, Florida for the third time", said Del Warren, Tournament Manager and Vice President of Kegel Training and Tournament centre. "In fact, I think we will make the theme of this tournament 'A Celebration of the Sport of Bowling'.

The World Ranking Masters features the top eight men and top eight women from each of the three WTBA zones (American, European and Asian) plus one male and one female bowler to be picked by the host - a total of 25 men and 25 women.

Sara Vargas, Colombia, will be on hand to defend the women's title while Khalid Al Dubyan of Kuwait, the 2006 men's World Ranking Masters champion did not qualify through the Asian rankings.

As tournament hosts, Kegel and USBC jointly selected Team USA members Bill Hoffman of Columbus, Ohio, and Diandra Asbaty of Chicago to represent the United States in the event. However, just before the start of the tournament Bill Hoffman had to unfortunately withdraw due to a foot injury. Hoffman was replaced at short notice by Team USA team-mate, David O'Sullivan of Orlando, Florida.

The Kegel/USBC World Ranking Masters will have a first prize of $10,000 US Dollars for both the men and the women and we will be paying down to 10th place.

"We will also be unveiling a few new ideas to help promote the sport of bowling with the goal of elevating our sport to the next level", Warren added.

"We want to express our gratitude to the World Tenpin Bowling Association for their confidence and willingness to give us the opportunity to host this prestigious event."

As earlier reported, the Qatar Bowling Federation (QBF) withdrew as host of the 2007 World Ranking Masters, which should originally take place in Doha, from April 30 through May 6. Three countries wanted to step in and have sent an application to the World Tenpin Bowling Association (WTBA), the USA], Finland and Indonesia. The WTBA decided in favour of the Kegel/USBC bid.

Participants - Women's Division

American Zone

 Rocio Restrepo
 Caroline Lagrange
 Paola Gomez
 Sara Vargas
 Karen Marcano
 Alicia Marcano
 Lynne Gauthier
 Aumi Guerra

Asian Zone

 Putty Armein
 Shalin Zulkifli
 Esther Cheah
 Lai Kin Ngoh
 Tannya Roumimper
 Zandra Aziela
 Choy Poh Lai
 Wendy Chai

European Zone

 Britt Brøndsted
 Zara Glover
 Nina Flack
 Isabelle Saldjian
 Helén Johnsson
 Anna Mattsson-Baard
 Patricia Schwarz
 Ivonne Gross

Host Country Pick

 Diandra Asbaty

Participants - Men's Division

American Zone

 Arturo Hernández
 Luis Rodriguez
 Mark Buffa
 David Romero
 Francisco Colon
 Rolando Antonio Sebelen
 Manuel Otalora
 Jaime Monroy

Asian Zone

 Remy Ong
 Ryan Lalisang
 Wu Siu Hong
 Alex Liew
 Azidi Ameran
 Biboy Rivera
 Yannaphon Larpapharat
 Zulmazran Zulkifli

European Zone

 Paul Moor
 Osku Palermaa
 Peter Ljung
 Stuart Williams
 Martin Larsen
 Thomas Gross
 Jason Belmonte
 Kai Virtanen

Host Country Pick

 David O'Sullivan
(Late replacement for Bill Hoffman)

Results

Kan Jam World Rankings

Top 8 (highlighted) qualify for quarter finals.

Qualifying - Women (top 12 only)

Top 8 (highlighted) qualify for quarter finals

Quarter Finals - Men

Quarter Finals - Women

Semi Finals - Men

Semi Finals - Women

Final - Men

Final - Women

Past events

Previous Finals - Men

Previous Finals - Women

External links
 World Ranking Masters Men's Medalists
 World Ranking Masters Women's Medalists
 Bowlinglinks all over the World, sorted by categories

Ten-pin bowling competitions